Samra Khan is a Dubai-based, Pakistani singer. She is the winner of the reality show Music Garage and singer of “Hina Ki Khusbu” Coke Studio Season 8.

Early life

She earned an MBA degree from Institute of Business Management. Her profession is as a banker. She pursued singing as a profession when she got a chance to sing in Coke Studio. She sang a duet" Hina Ki Khusbu" in a Coke Studio Season 8 along with Asim Azhar that made her dedicate herself to singing.

She has been a singer since she was 6 years old. After releasing “Hina ki Khushbu”, Khan released solo songs “Bol” and “Teri Sohbat” in collaboration with Playback Lounge, which were well taken by the audience.

She sang OSTs for different Pakistani dramas. Her famous OSTs are "Yeh Raha Dil" and "Gila”. Khan contested in a really show Music Garage, and ended up winning the Award of best singer 2018.

Discography

References

Living people
Singers from Karachi
Pakistani women singers
Pakistani musicians
Year of birth missing (living people)